The Petron Megaplaza is an office skyscraper located in Makati, Philippines. It previously held the title as the tallest building in the Philippines from 1998 to 2000 when the PBCom Tower was topped-off. It currently holds the title as the 5th tallest building in Makati, and the 9th-tallest building in the country and Metro Manila as well. It has a total ground to architectural spire top height of 210 meters, soaring at 45 storeys high.

Architecture and design

The developer and owner of Petron Megaplaza is Megaworld Corporation, one of the largest real estate companies in the Philippines. The word "Mega" in Megaplaza is in recognition of Megaworld Corporation's participation and ownership of the building.

The building was designed by world-renowned architectural firm Skidmore, Owings & Merrill, LLP, while the structural design works was made by well known Philippine engineering firm Aromin + Sy & Associates, in cooperation with another internationally known engineering company Ove Arup & Partners (presently known as Arup). Construction works was undertaken by D.M. Consunji, Inc., one of the largest general contractors in the country.

Location
The Petron Megaplaza is located at Gil Puyat Avenue (also known as Buendia Avenue) near the intersection with Makati Avenue, well within the Makati Central Business District. It is strategically positioned near other major establishments, including the Mandarin Oriental Manila, Citadel Inn and Makati Palace hotel, numerous office and residential buildings, and entertainment areas along Makati Avenue and Burgos Street.

Tenants
Petron Corporation was the building's main tenant from 1998 to 2010. It is also home to several large corporations and offices, including Cemex Philippines, Procter & Gamble Asia Pvt. Ltd. (P&G-GBS Manila Service Center), ZTE Philippines Inc., Wilhelmsen-Smith Bell Manning, Inc., Oberthur Card Systems, Alcatel Lucent Philippines Inc.,  International Committee of the Red Cross, Insurance Support Services International Corp., Diamond Hiland Inc., Elle & Vire Philippines., Omega Compliance Ltd., LBP Service Corp., Inter-Asia Services Corp., and the Norwegian embassy.

See also
 List of tallest buildings in the Philippines

References

External links
 Petron Megaplaza at Emporis

Skyscrapers in Makati
Skyscraper office buildings in Metro Manila
Skidmore, Owings & Merrill buildings
Office buildings completed in 1998